Elias Cobbaut (born 24 November 1997) is a Belgian professional footballer who plays as a left back for Italian Serie B club Parma. He also represents the Belgium national team.

Club career
On 28 August 2021, he joined Parma in Italy on loan with an option to buy. On 4 June 2022, Anderlecht announced that Parma had exercised the option to buy Cobbaut's contract.

International career
In November 2019 he was called up for the UEFA Euro 2020 qualifying matches against Russia and Cyprus on 16 and 19 November 2019, respectively. He made his debut against Cyprus.

Career statistics

References

External links

 
 

1997 births
Sportspeople from Mechelen
Footballers from Antwerp Province
Living people
Belgian footballers
Belgium under-21 international footballers
Belgium youth international footballers
Belgium international footballers
Association football fullbacks
K.R.C. Mechelen players
K.V. Mechelen players
R.S.C. Anderlecht players
Parma Calcio 1913 players
Belgian Pro League players
Serie B players
Belgian expatriate footballers
Expatriate footballers in Italy
Belgian expatriate sportspeople in Italy